Behind Closed Doors was a documentary series hosted by Joan Lunden that aired on the ABC and the A&E Network from 1996 to 2001.  Lunden took cameras to places that normally were off limits to the general public.

Some places featured included:
Up in the air aboard a U2 spyplane
Betty Ford Center
Behind the scenes of the New York City Subway
The United States Mint and Treasury
The WCW Powerplant
The USS Key West (SSN-722) and Navy SEAL team
The General Motors technical center in Warren, Michigan
Richard Tyler workshop

External links

https://web.archive.org/web/20121007194233/http://www.locatetv.com/tv/behind-closed-doors-with-joan-lunden/1777069/episode-guide

1996 American television series debuts
2001 American television series endings
1990s American documentary television series
2000s American documentary television series
American Broadcasting Company original programming
A&E (TV network) original programming